In Ghar (Arabic: عين غار, lit. Cave spring) is a town and commune, coextensive with the district of In Ghar, in In Salah Province, Algeria. According to the 2008 census it has a population of 11,225, up from 8,059 in 1998, with an annual growth rate of 3.4%. Its postal code is 11210 and its municipal code is 1103.

Geography

An oasis lies to the east of the town; it is extensively used for agriculture.

Climate

In Ghar has a hot desert climate (Köppen climate classification BWh), with long, extremely hot summers and short, very warm winters, little to no precipitation throughout the year, as well as permanent sunshine and clear skies.

Transportation

In Ghar lies on the northern side of the N52 national highway which connects the town to Aoulef and Reggane to the west and In Salah to the east.

Education

3.5% of the population has a tertiary education, and another 22.5% has completed secondary education. The overall literacy rate is 84.2%, and is 91.4% among males and 76.1% among females.

Localities
The commune is composed of eight localities:

In Ghar
Laksar
Tourfine
Chouiter
Lahdeb
Akbour
Miliana
Sebkha
Ez Zaouia

References

Neighbouring towns and cities

Communes of In Salah Province
Tuareg